This is a list of notable people from Watford, a town and borough in Hertfordshire, England, 15 miles (24 km) northwest of central London. People on this list may have been born in Watford or resided there for a significant period of time. People whose only connection to Watford is attendance at the Watford Grammar School for Boys or Watford Grammar School for Girls may be found listed as alumni in those articles.

Actors 

Bruce Alexander (1946–), actor, best known as Superintendent Norman Mullet in A Touch of Frost
Jane Alexander, actress
Michael Attwell (1943–2006), actor, EastEnders
Marion Bailey (1951–), actress
Sue Cleaver (1963–), actress, best known as Eileen Grimshaw in Coronation Street
Robert Glenister (1960–), actor, Hustle and Spooks
Adam Godley (1964–), screen and stage actor
Vinnie Jones, actor and former footballer
Matt King, actor, comedian and writer
Rebecca Lacey, actress
Terry Scott (1927–1994), TV and Carry On actor and comedian
Paul Terry, former child actor, star of James and the Giant Peach

Artists 
 Neil Lawson Baker (1938–), multi-disciplinary artist
 Jonathan Lemon (1965–), cartoonist

Businesspeople 
 Steve Easterbrook (1967–), former CEO of McDonald's
 Declan Ganley (1967–), businessman and political activist
 Nick Leeson (1967–), securities trader responsible for the collapse of Barings Bank in 1995

Entertainers 
Michael Bentine (1922–1996), comedian and former Goon
Cyril Fletcher (1913–2005), comedian
KSI (born 1993), rapper, actor, boxer and YouTube personality
Tim Lovejoy, television and radio presenter
Mary Portas, retail consultant and television presenter
 Chris Stark (born 1987), Radio 1 DJ
 Bradley Walsh, actor, comedian and television presenter

 John Rain, Podcaster, author.

Journalists 

 Barbara Amiel (1940–), British-Canadian journalist
 Sean Hoare (1963–2011), entertainment journalist

Musicians 
LTJ Bukem (1967–), drum and bass musician, producer and DJ
Ray Cooper (1942–), session and touring percussionist
George FitzGerald, electronic artist
Geri Halliwell (1972–), singer, member of the Spice Girls
Kyla La Grange, singer-songwriter
Gerald Moore (1899–1987), classical pianist
Rak-Su, boy band, winners of the fourteenth series of The X Factor, formed in Watford
The Staves, singer-songwriter trio whose members were born in Watford

Politicians 

 Mo Mowlam (1949–2005), Labour politician
 Mark Oaten, Liberal Democrat politician
 Nat Wei, Baron Wei, politician

Scientists and academics 
Geoffrey Hodgson (1948–), institutional economist and professor at Loughborough University
Marion McQuillan (1921 – 1998), British metallurgist who specialised in uses for titanium
Stuart Parkin (1948–), experimental physicist
Arthur Peacocke (1924–2006), biochemist and Anglican theologian
Arthur Geoffrey Walker (1909–2001), mathematician who contributed to general relativity theory

Sportspeople

Footballers 
 Luther Blissett (born 1958), Jamaican-born footballer for several clubs, most prominently Watford
 Tom Carroll (1992–), played for Swansea City
 Jack Collison (1988–), former West Ham United and Wales footballer, now head coach of Atlanta United 2
 Kenny Jackett (1962–), former manager of Wolverhampton Wanderers, former player for Watford and Wales national football team
 Lewis Kinsella, footballer for Colchester United
 Roy Low (1944-), footballer
 Craig Mackail-Smith, Luton Town and Scotland footballer
 Paul Robinson, footballer for several clubs including Watford
 Kelly Smith, Arsenal Ladies, England and Great Britain footballer
 Gareth Southgate, manager and former player for England men's national football team
 Ian Walker, former goalkeeper for various teams including England, later football manager
 Arthur Woodward (1906–1984), footballer who spent his entire career at Watford
 Frank Yallop (1964–), former footballer turned manager

Cricketers 

 Steven Finn (1989–), Middlesex and England cricketer
 Mark Ilott (1970–), former England cricketer
 Nick Knight, cricketer turned commentator
 Jeremy Quinlan (1965–), cricketer
 Robert Simons (1922–2011), cricketer

Others 
 Reece Bellotti, former Commonwealth featherweight boxing champion
 Anthony Joshua, 2012 Olympic boxing gold medalist
 Alex Roy, (1974–), professional darts player
 John Taylor (1945–), former rugby player for Wales and British & Irish Lions, later commentator

Writers 
Gurpreet Kaur Bhatti, English Sikh screenwriter and playwright
T. E. B. Clarke (1907–1989), screenwriter and novelist
Anthony Berkeley Cox (1893–1971), crime fiction author

Others 
John Lawley, Commissioner in The Salvation Army
George Pearkes (1888–1984), Canadian politician and soldier
Mike Pilavachi, evangelist and founder of Soul Survivor

References 

Watford